South Somerset is a local government district in the English county of Somerset. The district has a population of about 158,000, and has Yeovil as its administrative centre.

In the United Kingdom, the term listed building refers to a building or other structure officially designated as being of special architectural, historical or cultural significance; Grade I structures are those considered to be "buildings of exceptional interest". Listing was begun by a provision in the Town and Country Planning Act 1947. Once listed, severe restrictions are imposed on the modifications allowed to a building's structure or its fittings. In England, the authority for listing under the Planning (Listed Buildings and Conservation Areas) Act 1990 rests with Historic England, a non-departmental public body sponsored by the Department for Digital, Culture, Media and Sport; local authorities have a responsibility to regulate and enforce the planning regulations.

There are 94 Grade I listed buildings in South Somerset. Most are Norman- or medieval-era churches, many of which are included in the Somerset towers—a collection of distinctive, mostly spireless Gothic church towers—but there are other religious buildings as well. Muchelney Abbey consists of the remains and foundations of a medieval Benedictine Abbey and an early Tudor house dating from the 16th century, formerly the lodgings of the resident abbot. Stavordale Priory was built as a priory church in the 13th century and was converted into a private residence in 1533. The Hamstone Stoke sub Hamdon Priory is a 14th-century former priest's house of the chantry chapel of St Nicholas, which after 1518 become a farm known as Parsonage Farmhouse. It remained a farm until about 1960, and has been owned by the National Trust since 1946.

Since the Reformation the 13th century Hanging Chapel in Langport has been a town hall, courthouse, grammar school, museum, and armoury before becoming a masonic hall in 1891. The house known as The Abbey in Charlton Mackrell takes its name from the site on which it was built, the Chantry Chapel of the Holy Spirit, founded in 1237. Naish Priory, built around 1400 in East Coker, was never a priory, and similarly the Abbey Farm House and Abbey Barn in Yeovil which date from around 1420, have always been in lay-ownership; "abbey" was added to their names in the 19th century. The  Burton Pynsent Monument was designed in 1757, by Lancelot "Capability" Brown for William Pitt, as a monument to Sir William Pynsent. The tower's funder, Henry Hoare, planned for it to commemorate the end of the Seven Years' War against France and the accession of King George III. The other Grade I listed buildings in South Somerset are manor houses, built over long periods by local Lords of the Manor. In 1907, the Tudor Barrington Court became the first country house acquired by the National Trust, on the recommendation of the antiquarian Canon Hardwicke Rawnsley. Newton Surmaville was built between 1608 and 1612 for Robert Harbin, a Yeovil merchant, on the site of an earlier building, but was extensively altered and enhanced in the 1870s. Lytes Cary and its associated chapel and gardens have parts dating to as early as the 14th century. The architectural historian Nikolaus Pevsner praised it, saying "Yet all parts blend to perfection with one another and with the gentle sunny landscape that surrounds them." The 17th century house at Tintinhull is surrounded by a small 20th century Arts and Crafts garden. Ven House, which stands on an artificially raised terrace, has a rectangular plan of seven bays by five bays, and is built of red brick in Flemish bond, with local Hamstone dressings; its north and south fronts are divided by two giant Corinthian pilasters. The small William and Mary style house was completed sometime between 1698 and 1700. It was enlarged between 1725 and 1730 by Decimus Burton, who provided a new drawing room for Sir W. Medleycott and also an orangery attached to the house. Brympton d'Evercy, built in stages between about 1220 and the 18th century, has been described, by Auberon Waugh, as "the most beautiful house in England".

Buildings

|}

See also
 Grade I listed buildings in Somerset
 List of Somerset towers
 Grade II* listed buildings in South Somerset

Notes

References

External links
 South Somerset Council page on listed buildings

 
South Somerset
Lists of Grade I listed buildings in Somerset